The 2008 British Figure Skating Championships were held from 7 to 12 January 2008 in Sheffield. Skaters competed across the levels of senior (Olympic-level), junior, and novice, and across the disciplines of men's singles, ladies' singles, pair skating, ice dancing, and synchronized skating. The event was used to help pick the British teams to the 2008 World Championships, the 2008 European Championships, and the 2008 World Junior Championships.

The senior compulsory dance was the Yankee Polka and the junior compulsory dance was the Viennese Waltz. The first novice compulsory dance was the Rocker Foxtrot and the second one was the Paso Doble.

Senior results

Men

Ladies

Pairs

Ice dancing

Synchronized

Junior results

Men

Ladies

Pairs

Ice dancing

Novice results

Men

Ladies

Pairs

Ice dancing

Synchronized

External links
 2008 John Wilson/MK British Ice Figure & Synchronized Skating Championships results

British Figure Skating Championships, 2008
British Figure Skating Championships
Figure Skating Championships